Huojuvat Keulat is a 1946 poetry collection by Finnish poet Aaro Hellaakoski. The poems consist of short verses reflecting on nature and travel through the landscape.

Extract

Sources

External links
 

1946 poetry books
Finnish poetry collections